WRIK 750 AM is a radio station broadcasting a country music format. Licensed to Brookport, Illinois, the station serves the Paducah, Kentucky area operating only during daytime hours, and is owned by Daniel S. Stratemeyer.

WRIK also broadcasts on a translator at 97.5, using the moniker River Country.

References

External links
River Country 97.5 Twitter
River Country 97.5 Facebook

Country radio stations in the United States
RIK
RIK